Carretera de Cádiz, also known as District 7, is one of the 11 districts of the city of Málaga, Spain.

Wards
It comprises de following wards (barrios):
 
  25 Años de Paz
  Alaska
  Almudena
  Ardira
  Ave María
  Barceló
  Cortijo Vallejo
  Dos Hermanas
  El Higueral
  El Torcal
  Finca El Pato
  Girón
  Guadaljaire
  Haza de la Pesebrera
  Haza Honda
  Huelin
  Industrial La Pelusa
  Industrial La Térmica
  Industrial Nuevo San Andrés
  Industrial Puerta Blanca
  Jardín de la Abadía
  La Luz
  La Paz
  La Princesa
  Las Delicias
  Los Girasoles
  Los Guindos
  Mainake
  Málaga 2000
  Minerva
  Nuevo San Andrés 1
  Nuevo San Andrés 2
  Pacífico
  Parque Ayala
  Parque Mediterráneo
  Polígono Comercial Guadalhorce
  Polígono Comercial Pacífico
  Polígono Comercial Valdicio
  Polígono Industrial Carranza
  Polígono Industrial Guadaljaire
  Polígono Industrial Los Guindos
  Puerta Blanca
  Regio
  Sacaba Beach
  San Andrés
  San Carlos
  San Carlos Condote
  Santa Isabel
  Santa Paula
  Sixto
  Tabacalera
  Torre del Río
  Torres de la Serna
  Virgen de Belén
  Vistafranca.

References

External links

 Málaga Council official website

Districts of Málaga